Lasioglossum tuolumnense is a species of sweat bee in the family Halictidae.

References

Further reading

 .

tuolumnense
Insects described in 2009